Vitaliy Alisevich (10 March 1967 – 28 October 2012) was a Belarusian hammer thrower. He competed at the 1986 World Junior Championships in Athletics for the Soviet Union, where he got a gold medal, and represented Belarus at the 1994 European Athletics Championships, taking ninth place. Alisevich also won a gold medal at the Baltic Sea Games in 1997 and a bronze medal at the 1995 Military World Games.

He was twice champion at the Belarusian Athletics Championships, winning in 1992 and 1994, as well as being runner-up at the CIS Winter Throwing Championships in 1992.

His personal best throw of 82.16 m in 1988 ranked him 11th on the all-time lists at that point. He was married to Belarusian heptathlete Tatyana Alisevich.

International competitions

National titles
Belarusian Athletics Championships
Hammer throw: 1992, 1994

See also
List of Belarusian Athletics Championships winners

References

External links

1967 births
2012 deaths
Soviet male hammer throwers
Belarusian male hammer throwers
Belarusian Athletics Championships winners
World Athletics U20 Championships winners